San Biase is a comune (municipality) in the Province of Campobasso in the Italian region Molise, located about  northwest of Campobasso.

San Biase borders the municipalities Salcito, Sant'Angelo Limosano, and Trivento.

Traditions

The principal traditions are the San Biagio feast (3 February) with the playing of the Morra and the distribution of bread to all the Inhabitants, the Santa Pia feast on 14 August, the Ferragosto festivity on 15 August and the Sagra delle Sagne alla Z'Flmen on 16 August.
Formerly the four quarters (Rioni) challenged themselves in the "Palio dei Rioni" and "Palio degli Asini" (donkey race around the football pitch) games, but they are currently not organized because of economic problems.

San Biase had a strong negative migration from 1950s to 1970s/1980s and now there are very few young people in the village, but the families of the people who migrated return to the village in Summer, especially in August.

See also
 Molise Croats

References

Cities and towns in Molise